Playboi Carti (commonly referred to as Self Titled) is the debut mixtape by American rapper Playboi Carti. It was released on April 14, 2017, by AWGE Label and Interscope Records. The mixtape features production from Pi'erre Bourne, Southside and others, and guest appearances from American rappers Lil Uzi Vert, ASAP Rocky, and Dutch singer Leven Kali. The physical version of the mixtape was released on October 6, 2017, and a vinyl edition was released on November 17, 2017.

The mixtape was supported by three singles – "Lookin", "Wokeuplikethis", and "Magnolia", the third peaking at number 29 on the US Billboard Hot 100. It was Carti's highest-charting single at the time.

Release
Two singles were released prior to the mixtape's release. These included "Lookin", which featured Lil Uzi Vert, released on March 9, 2017, and "Wokeuplikethis", which also featured Lil Uzi Vert, which released on March 10, 2017. The single "Magnolia" was released on April 14, 2017 prior the mixtape's release

Playboi Carti debuted at number 12 on the US Billboard 200, with 28,000 album-equivalent units, of which 21,000 were streaming units and 7,000 were pure album sales. As of September 2017, the mixtape has moved over 367,000 units. The mixtape was certified Gold by the RIAA on January 10, 2018 for sales over 500,000 units.

A music video was released for "Magnolia" on July 10, 2017. It was directed by Hidji Films and features cameo appearance from the song's producer Pi'erre Bourne, as well as cameo appearances from Southside, ASAP Rocky, Slim Jxmmi, A Boogie wit da Hoodie, Don Q, Nav, Casanova, Smooky Margielaa, Squidnice and Cash, one of the XO members. It has amassed over 170 million views as of September 2022.

A music video was released for "Wokeuplikethis" on August 9, 2017. The music video features Lil Uzi Vert, and has amassed over 80 million views as of September 2022.

A music video for "New Choppa" was released on August 31, 2017. It features ASAP Rocky, and has amassed over 30 million views as of September 2022.

Critical reception

The mixtape received generally positive reviews from critics. In a positive review, Jon Caramanica of The New York Times called the project "erratic, sometimes transfixingly so," stating that "Playboi Carti’s album takes hip-hop’s ad-lib era to its logical extreme — everything sounds like an ad-lib, even the main lyrics." In a more negative review, HipHopDX critic Narshima Chintaluri described the record as "simply a glorified beat tape with ad-libs", stating Carti "need[s] to further develop his songwriting in order to maintain this allure alongside his more successful contemporaries."

Brian Duricy of PopMatters described the record as "the sonic equivalent of the stereotypical laissez-faire worker who breezes through presentations on sheer personality alone," stating that "over the production, however, you’re not getting particularly much." Pitchfork's Briana Younger wrote that "Playboi Carti feels like a break from life, the soundtrack to a mindless good time," and adding that "Carti is tactful in discerning where and when he can get away with letting the instrumental ride and when he needs to rise to the occasion." The single "Magnolia" was awarded Best New Track by Pitchfork.

Accolades
The mixtape appeared on 2017 year-end album lists by publications such as Fact, Pitchfork, and Tiny Mix Tapes. John Twells of Fact stated that the project "adeptly taps into a widespread youthful malaise and the genre-fluid playlist culture that has come to dominate rap’s mainstream [...] Sad and restless but also party-ready, Playboi Carti doesn’t need political rambling or conscious posturing to get its message across." Corrigan B of Tiny Mix Tapes wrote that "of everything that 2017 promised about rap’s future, Playboi Carti felt the most like a real path forward, a crystallization of the SoundCloud underground’s zeitgeist in a format built to transcend the scene’s messy adolescence."

Track listing
Credits adapted from the album's liner notes and ASCAP.

Notes
  signifies an uncredited co-producer
 "Wokeuplikethis" is stylized as "wokeuplikethis*"
 "Do That Shit" is stylized as "dothatshit!"
 "Let It Go" features uncredited additional background vocals by MexikoDro
 "Kelly K" features uncredited additional background vocals by Blakk Soul

Sample credits
 "Location" contains samples of "Endomorph", written by Allan Holdsworth and Rowanne Mark, as performed by Holdsworth.

Personnel
Credits adapted from the album's liner notes.

Technical

 Hector Delgado – mixing , recording 
 Frankly Kastle – mixing assistant 
 Harry Fraud – recording 
 Tatsuya Sato – mastering 
 Kesha Lee – mixing , recording , mastering 
 Roark Bailey – recording 
 Max Lord – recording 
 Finis "KY" White – mixing 
 Dan FryFe – recording assistant 
 David Kim – mixing , recording

Charts

Weekly charts

Year-end charts

Certifications

References

External links
 

2017 mixtape albums
2017 debut albums
Albums produced by Southside (record producer)
Albums produced by Hit-Boy
Albums produced by Harry Fraud
Albums produced by Jake One
Albums produced by Pi'erre Bourne
Interscope Records albums
Cloud rap albums
Playboi Carti albums